| tries = {{#expr:

 + 3 + 4 + 4 + 7
 + 2 + 3 + 6 + 4
 + 9 + 4 + 1 + 7
 +11 + 4 + 2 + 3
 + 5 + 2 + 3 +10
 + 9 + 3 +11 + 9
 + 0 + 5 + 4 + 4

 + 2 + 6 + 0
 + 5 + 3 +10
 + 6 + 4 + 4
 + 3 + 8 + 3
 + 4 + 5 + 4
 +10 + 6 + 2
 + 8 + 2 + 9

 + 4 + 7 + 6 + 1
 + 5 + 0
 + 5
}}
| top point scorer = David Humphreys (Ulster)122 points
| top try scorer = Girvan Dempsey (Leinster)Denis Hickie (Leinster)7 tries
| website = www.rabodirectpro12.com
| prevseason =
| nextseason = 2002–03
}}
The 2001–02 Celtic League was the inaugural season of the Celtic League. The first season would see fifteen teams compete: the four Irish provinces (Connacht, Leinster, Munster and Ulster), two Scottish teams (Edinburgh Reivers and Glasgow) and all nine Welsh Premier Division teams (Bridgend, Caerphilly, Cardiff, Ebbw Vale, Llanelli, Neath, Newport, Pontypridd and Swansea).

Played alongside each country's own national competitions, the teams were split into two groups (of 8 and 7) and played a series of round-robin matches with each team playing the other only once. The top four teams from each group proceeded into the knock-out phase until a champion was found. Clashes between teams in the 2001–02 Welsh-Scottish League also counted towards the new competition.

The 2001–02 competition was dominated by the Irish teams with all four sides reaching the last eight, three progressing to the semi-finals, and the final played at Lansdowne Road contested between Leinster and Munster with Leinster running out 24–20 winners.

Background 
Wales and Scotland had joined forces for the 1999 and 2000 seasons, with the expansion of the Welsh Premier Division to include Edinburgh and Glasgow to form the Welsh-Scottish League.

In 2001, an agreement was made between the Irish Rugby Football Union (IRFU), Scottish Rugby Union (SRU) and Welsh Rugby Union (WRU) to create a new competition which would bring in the four Irish provinces. 2001 would see the very first incarnation of the Celtic League.

Teams

Pool stage 
The teams were split into two pools and the pool stage consisted of a single round-robin; each team played the other teams in its pool once only.

Pool A Table

Pool A Fixtures

Pool B Table

Pool B Fixtures

Knockout stages

Quarter-finals

Semi-finals

Final

Leading scorers
Note: Flags to the left of player names indicate national team as has been defined under IRB eligibility rules, or primary nationality for players who have not yet earned international senior caps. Players may hold one or more non-IRB nationalities.

Top points scorers

Top try scorers

Notes

External links 
 Official Web site
Tables
Fixtures and results
 Season Archive at BBC

References 

 
2001-02
 
Celtic
Celtic
Celtic
Celt